The 2016 Lorraine Open 88 was a professional tennis tournament played on outdoor clay courts. It was the tenth edition of the tournament and part of the 2016 ITF Women's Circuit, offering a total of $100,000 in prize money. It took place in Contrexéville, France, on 4–10 July 2016.

Singles main draw entrants

Seeds 

 1 Rankings as of 27 June 2016.

Other entrants 
The following player received a wildcard into the singles main draw:
  Victoria Muntean
  Chloé Paquet
  Harmony Tan
  Margot Yerolymos

The following players received entry from the qualifying draw:
  Audrey Albié
  Alice Bacquié
  Doroteja Erić
  Diāna Marcinkēviča

The following player received entry by a protected ranking:
  Claire Feuerstein

Champions

Singles

 Pauline Parmentier def.  Océane Dodin, 6–1, 6–1

Doubles

 Cindy Burger /  Laura Pous Tió def.  Nicole Melichar /  Renata Voráčová, 6–1, 6–3

External links 
 2016 Lorraine Open 88 at ITFtennis.com
 Official website 

2016 ITF Women's Circuit
2016 in French tennis
Grand Est Open 88